Francis Oats (29 October 1848 – 1 September 1918) was a Cornish miner who became chairman of De Beers diamond company.
He made extensive investments in the Cornish tin mining industry, which collapsed after he had died.
He is known for Porthledden, a mansion he built at the tip of Cornwall.

Early years

Francis Oats was born on 29 October 1848, at South Torfrey Farm, Golant, near Fowey, Cornwall, England, in the parish of St Sampson.
His parents were Francis Oats (1794–1871) and Maria Rundle (1810–97).
His father was a farmer.
His younger sister Maria was born in 1850.
The family moved to St Just in Penwith, a mining district, about 1854.
Like most young men in the district Oats became a miner when he left school, but every week he would walk to Penzance, seven miles away, to attend evening classes so he could become a mining engineer.
At the age of 17, Oats placed second in the mineralogy examination for the British Isles, and obtained a high grade in mining, a subject in which he had not been instructed. 
He was offered free tuition at the London School of Mines but would have to pay his expenses, and no scholarship was available.

Francis Oats was first appointed Mine Agent in 1871.
He was mining captain at Botallack Mine.
For a while Oats also gave science classes in the Botallack district.
He married Elizabeth Ann Olds on 17 August 1874, in St Just in Penwith, daughter of a butcher.
Two of their children died in infancy.
Their surviving children were Francis Freathey (b. 1879), Wilfred (b. 1883), Giles (b. 1885) and Marie Elise (b. 1887).

South Africa

Government mines inspector
On 9 December 1874, Oats was appointed Cape Colony Government Mining Engineer at Kimberley, South Africa, at the age of 26.
Oats left for South Africa on a 20-month mission in January 1875.
The colony's government had recently passed ordinances in favour of small miners which prevented mine concession owners from imposing excessive rentals on the diggers and shopkeepers, and did not allow an individual or company to hold more than ten claims.
The British government had overridden some of these measures.
The proprietors continued to accumulate claims and raise rents, causing mounting unrest.
Oats, as Provincial Engineer, gave the decisive opinion that "fostering a large number of individual holdings is most adverse to economy of working.
Oats made it clear that the restriction on the number of claims would be an obstacle to obtaining foreign capital.
He wrote of the 10 claim limit,

Oats resumed his position at Botallack as soon as he returned.

Mining executive

In May 1877 Oats was asked to take a position in Kimberley, which he accepted.
The job was to run the Kimberley mines for Baring-Gould and Atkins Co.
In 1883, he joined the Victoria Mine company.
De Beers Mining, headed by Cecil Rhodes, obtained control of Victoria company in 1887 using financing from Stow and Jules Porges & Co., who began quiet purchases of Victoria shares early in 1887, and obtained most of its share capital for £57,000.
On learning this and that the Victoria claims were surrounded by De Beers mergers, Oats and R. Hinrichson, directors of Victoria, agreed to amalgamate in April 1887 in exchange for scrip and stock with nominal value of £445,000 plus other assets.
Both Oats and Hinrichson became directors of De Beers.

By the start of 1890, De Beers had an effective monopoly on the South African diamond trade.
The poorer mines had been closed and production reduced to push up the price of diamonds.
The Wesselton Mine was discovered late in 1890.
The De Beers directors were unwilling to buy the mine, but were reluctantly persuaded after Oats had investigated it and described the damage it could do to diamond prices.

There were many Cornish miners at Kimberley, particularly as the mines became deeper and their skills in mining hard rock became more important.
Oats did his best for these miners.
He insisted that De Beers give each miner a yearly paid holiday in Cornwall.
He also forced adoption of water hydrants to lay the dust created by mining drills, the main cause of silicosis.
He became president of the Cornish Association at Kimberley.
Oats was elected to represent Namaqualand in the South African parliament, holding office until 1907.
During the Second Boer War in 1899, Oats was a member of the Civilian Defence Force.
In 1901, Francis Oats and his son Francis Freathy Oats visited South America.

Oats became known as an authority on diamonds.
In December 1906 Oats visited Henri Lemoine in Paris with three others, and saw Lemoine (stark naked to show he had nothing hidden) mix substances in a crucible, heat it in a huge furnace, and produce tiny diamonds.
Oats demanded repeats of the experiment, and remained sceptical of some trick, saying the diamonds were too close in colour and shape to those of the Jagersfontein Mine near Kimberley.
Lemoine was arrested on charges of fraud on 11 December? 1907.
In 1908, a Parisian jeweller said he had sold Lemoine some small, uncut diamonds from the Jagersfontein mine that matched the description of the diamonds Lemoine was supposed to have manufactured. Lemoine fled the country before receiving judgement.

Chairman of De Beers

In 1908, Oats was appointed chairman of De Beers.
That year he told the company's annual general meeting, "Really, if one could believe all the stories which have been circulating about the discovery of new mines and methods for the artificial making of diamonds, it would be a marvel that people are willing to buy diamonds at all. ... There have been numerous discoveries of alleged mines in all parts of the world, but none of them have come to the serious production stage except German S.W. Africa where a discovery has been made of some superficial deposits of diamonds, but fortunately for our prices, these, singularly enough, are all small in size."
Oats was making a serious error in discounting the German discovery, which had large and high quality diamonds, and dismissing Ernest Oppenheimer's Premier Mine, which was producing more than the total output of De Beers.

The Kimberley diamond mines were shut down on 8 August 1914, soon after the start of World War I (1914–18).
Francis Oats said the 1,000 men employed at the mines would be given half pay until the end of January 1915, when the company would decide what to do next.
He said of the closure,

In May 1916, the Wesselton Mine and Bultfontein Mine were reopened, but the Big Hole had closed for good.
Francis Oats died on 1 September 1918, in Port Elizabeth, Eastern Cape, South Africa.
He was survived by his widow, daughter and three sons.
The Francis Oats House, a hostel for pupils at the Kimberley Boys' High School, was built in 1920 and was still in use in 2016.

Cornish investments
On a visit back to Cornwall, Oats bought shares in the Levant Mine.
He also took shareholdings in the Cape Cornwall and Kenidjack mines.
At the time of his death he was chairman of Basset Mines of Redruth.
He tried to modernise the tin mine at St Just by sinking a new vertical shaft so that ore could be raised direct from the lower levels to the surface, a project that seemed even then to be uneconomical.
His large investments in mining in Cornwall were misguided, since the industry would collapse after his death.

Oats arranged for construction of Porthledden, a 21-bedroom mansion in Cape Cornwall designed as a gentleman's residence that was completed in 1909. 
He does not seem to have spent much time there, perhaps due to the length of the journey from South Africa.
The terraces of the garden are above the north side of Priest's Cove at Cape Cornwall.
On the south side of the cove there are adits cut into the cliff for the St Just Mine.
His son made Porthledden into a hotel, but it did not succeed. It was sold in the 1950s to pay off family debts, and later fell into disrepair.

Notes

Sources

Further reading

1848 births
1918 deaths
British miners
People from St Just in Penwith
British emigrants to South Africa
South African people of Cornish descent